Henning Bjarnøy (born 16 April 1964) is a Norwegian footballer. He played in six matches for the Norway national football team from 1983 to 1984.

References

External links
 

1964 births
Living people
Norwegian footballers
Norway international footballers
Place of birth missing (living people)
Association football forwards
Vålerenga Fotball players